Pérouges (Arpitan: Pèrôges) is a commune in the Ain department in the Auvergne-Rhône-Alpes region in Eastern France. In 2019, Pérouges had a population of 1,273.

History
Pérouges was inhabited by craftsmen; mainly farmers and linen weavers. It was probably founded by a Gallic colony returning from Perugia in Italy. In 1167, the Seigneur d'Anthon famously shut the commune's walls against the troops of the Archbishop of Lyon, and as early as 1236 the inhabitants earned communal freedom. In 1601 the town officially became French. Until the end of the 18th century, the textile industry in Pérouges boomed. In the 19th century, however, roads and railroads were re-routed and the population dropped from 1,500 to 90. But, starting in 1911, the town was restored and houses were saved. Today, Pérouges is a popular tourist attraction.

Origin
According to the archaeological findings,  humans have been present at  Pérouges since the Chalcolithic (about –2500 to –1800) age. There is no date for the construction of the fortress itself, but its first written mention appears in 12th century, therefore it is assumed to be built in that period. Although the town has been attacked by French soldiers on multiple occasions, it still prospered, due to its location and proximity to the trade routes. The town is located between Lyon and Geneva, which was one of the active local trade routes, therefore, craftsmanship and trade in the region flourished. The area officially became part of France under the rule of Henri IV in 1601.

Demographics

Films set in Pérouges
Given its authentic historical appearance, Pérouges is often used as the setting for period films by French directors and others.

Films set in Pérouges are:
 Monsieur Vincent Fr:(1947)
 Les trois mousquetaires Fr:(1961)
 Mandrin
 Fanfan la Tulipe Fr:(1962)
 The Bride Br:(1985)
 The Hour of the Pig Br:(1993)

Cultural events
A spring festival has been held annually between April and June and hosts musical events ranging from Baroque to jazz.

See also
Communes of the Ain department

References

External links

 Official website 
 Perouges Preservation Committee - Museum, Watch Tower, Garden and House of Princes visits with Contemporary Art exhibitions 

Communes of Ain
Plus Beaux Villages de France
Ain communes articles needing translation from French Wikipedia